The men's Shot Put at the 2014 IAAF World Indoor Championships took place on 7 March 2014.

Medalists

Records

Qualification standards

Schedule

Results

Qualification

Qualification: 20.70 (Q) or at least 8 best performers (q) qualified for the final.

Final

References

Shot Put
Shot put at the World Athletics Indoor Championships